San Cosme is a town in Corrientes Province, Argentina. It is the capital of San Cosme Department.

From 1912 until 1927 San Cosme had a railway station on a branch line of the Ferrocarril Económico Correntino narrow gauge railway.

External links

Populated places in Corrientes Province